Sylvain Ripoll (born 15 August 1971) is a French former football player and current manager who manages the French under-21 football team.

Career
As a player, Ripoll played with Stade Rennais, Le Mans and FC Lorient. 

On 25 May 2014, he was appointed as the new manager of Lorient. He won his first game as a manager in the first Ligue 1 game of the season. Lorient managed to beat AS Monaco with 1–2 in their own Stade Louis II.

References

1971 births
Living people
Footballers from Rennes
French footballers
Association football midfielders
Stade Rennais F.C. players
Le Mans FC players
FC Lorient players
Ligue 1 players
Ligue 2 players
French football managers
FC Lorient managers
Ligue 1 managers
France national under-21 football team managers